Empire Cymric was a   Ferry that was built in 1944 by Harland & Wolff Ltd, Belfast as LST (3) HMS LST 3010 for the Royal Navy. She was transferred to the Koninklijke Marine in 1945, serving as HNLMS LST 3010. In 1947, she was transferred back to the Royal Navy and renamed HMS Attacker. The ship was requisitioned by the Ministry of Transport in 1954 and renamed Empire Cymric. Requisitioned briefly during the Suez Crisis in 1956 as HMS Empire Cymric, she served until 1962, and was scrapped in 1963.

Description
The ship was built in 1944 by Harland & Wolff Ltd, Belfast.

The ship was propelled by a 5,500 ihp triple expansion steam engine which was supplied by two 3-drum boilers.

In Royal Navy service, armament was 8 x 20mm AA guns.

History
LST 3010 was launched on 30 September 1944. She was commissioned into the Royal Navy on 5 April 1945.

LST 3010 was transferred to the Koninklijke Marine in 1945. In February and March 1946, LST 3010 was in service in Java, Dutch East Indies, where a war of independence was taking place. In 1947, she was returned to the Royal Navy and was renamed Attacker. She was chartered by the Ministry of Transport and converted to a ferry. In 1955, she was sold to the Atlantic Steam Navigation Company and renamed Empire Cymric. Operated on the Preston, Lancashire - Belfast, Northern Ireland route, Empire Cymric was requisitioned by the Royal Navy for use during the Suez Crisis. She served until 1963, arriving on 1 October at Faslane, Dunbartonshire for scrapping.

References

External links
Photo of Empire Cymric
Photo of Empire Cymric

LST (3)-class tank landing ships
1944 ships
Ships built in Belfast
Empire ships
LST (3)-class tank landing ships of the Royal Netherlands Navy
Troop ships of the Netherlands
Ferries of the United Kingdom
Steamships of the United Kingdom
Merchant ships of the United Kingdom
Ships built by Harland and Wolff